Ben Hur is a TV miniseries that first aired in 2010. Based on Lew Wallace's 1880 novel, Ben-Hur: A Tale of the Christ, the series was produced by Alchemy Television Group in association with Drimtim Entertainment and Muse Entertainment in Montreal. It aired on Canada's CBC network on April 4, 2010, and aired later in 2010 on ABC in the United States.

Ben-Hur was directed by Steve Shill,  and stars Kristin Kreuk, Ray Winstone, Art Malik, Hugh Bonneville and Joseph Morgan as Judah Ben-Hur. The film was written by Alan Sharp.

Plot

Episode 1

Episode 2

Cast
 Joseph Morgan as Judah Ben-Hur/Sextus Arrius, a wealthy Jerusalem merchant.
 Stephen Campbell Moore as Octavius Messala, a Roman officer.
 Emily VanCamp as Esther, Ben Hur's fiancée.
 Kristin Kreuk as Tirzah, Ben Hur's sister.
 Simón Andreu as Simonides, Esther's father.
 Hugh Bonneville as Pontius Pilate, governor of Judaea
 James Faulkner as Marcellus Agrippa, Messala's father
 Alex Kingston as Ruth, Ben Hur's mother.
 Art Malik as Sheik Ilderim, a wealthy Bedouin.
 Marc Warren as David Ben Levi, Ben Hur's overseer.
 Lucía Jiménez as Athene, a Greek courtesan.
 Miguel Ángel Muñoz as Antegua, a galley slave
 Ray Winstone as Quintus Arrius, a Roman admiral.
 Ben Cross as Emperor Tiberius
 Kris Holden-Ried as Gaius Antonius, a Roman officer.
 Michael Nardone as Hortator (galley slave master)
 Julian Casey as Jesus Christ
 Eugene Simon as Young Ben Hur
 Toby Marlow as Young Messala
 Daniella Ereny as Young Tirzah

References

External links

 
 
 

2010 Canadian television series debuts
2010 Canadian television series endings
2010s Canadian drama television series
2010s Canadian television miniseries
Television dramas set in ancient Rome
Works based on Ben-Hur
English-language television shows
Cultural depictions of Pontius Pilate
Cultural depictions of Tiberius
Portrayals of Jesus on television
Television series set in the 1st century
Television series by Sony Pictures Television